The following is an episode list for the UKTV nature documentary David Attenborough's Natural Curiosities. The series is presented by Sir David Attenborough and was first broadcast in the United Kingdom on Eden on 29 January 2013.

Series overview

Episodes

Series 1 (2013)

Series 2 (2014)

Series 3 (2015)

Series 4 (2017)

References

External links
 David Attenborough's Natural Curiosities Episode Guide on the Watch website

Lists of British non-fiction television series episodes
List